Tadeusz Kościuszko was a soldier respected as a champion of liberty in both Poland and the United States.
For things named after this person, see List of things named after Tadeusz Kościuszko.

War 
 Kościuszko Uprising, a 1794 Polish war of independence

Military 
 Kościuszko's Squadron, a Polish fighter squadron in the Polish-Soviet War of 1919–21
 No. 303 Squadron RAF, known as the No. 303 "Kościuszko", was a Second World War Polish fighter squadron
 1st Tadeusz Kościuszko Infantry Division, a Second World War unit, part of the 1st Polish Army
 111th Fighter Escadrille (Poland), known as Kościuszko's squadron, was a Polish fighter squadron in the Invasion of Poland of 1939
 Tadeusz Kościuszko Land Forces Military Academy in Wrocław, Poland

Ships 
 , a Polish Navy rocket frigate
 SS Kościuszko, a Polish ocean liner
 Kosciusko a ferry on Sydney Harbour named after Mount Kosciuszko

Places

Antarctica
 Mount Kosciusko (Antarctica), a mountain  in Marie Byrd Land, Antarctica

Australia 
Kosciuszko, New South Wales, a locality in the Snowy Valleys Region
Kosciuszko National Park, New South Wales
 Mount Kosciuszko, the highest mountain in Australia (not including its external territories)

United States 
 Kosciusko, Mississippi
 Kosciusko, Texas
 Kosciusko County, Indiana
 Kosciuszko Park (Chicago)
 Kosciusko Island in Alaska
 Kosciuszko Bridge  in New York City
 Thaddeus Kosciusko Bridge in Albany, New York
 Thaddeus Kosciuszko National Memorial in Philadelphia, Pennsylvania

Poland 
 Kościuszko Mound in Kraków

Music 
 "Kosciusko" is a track on Midnight Oil's album Red Sails in the Sunset
 Kosciuszko is a 2011 album by the Australian alternative rock band Jebediah

People
Jacques Kosciusco-Morizet, French ambassador
Nathalie Kosciusko-Morizet, a French politician

Products
 Kosciusko mustard, a Plochman's brand